Kluky is a municipality and village in Kutná Hora District in the Central Bohemian Region of the Czech Republic. It has about 500 inhabitants.

Administrative parts
Villages of Nová Lhota, Olšany and Pucheř are administrative parts of Kluky.

References

Villages in Kutná Hora District

´